Nasty Nigel may refer to:

 Nigel Lythgoe (born 1949), English television and film director and producer, television dance competition judge, and choreographer
 Nasty Nigel (rapper) (born 1989), American hip hop recording artist